Meduno is a comune (municipality) in the Province of Pordenone in the Italian region Friuli-Venezia Giulia, located about  northwest of Trieste and about  northeast of Pordenone.

The municipality of Meduno contains the frazione (subdivision) Navarons.

Meduno borders the following municipalities: Cavasso Nuovo, Frisanco, Sequals, Tramonti di Sopra, Tramonti di Sotto, Travesio. 

The Italian-American sculptor Luigi Del Bianco, the chief carver of Mount Rushmore, spent his youth in Meduno.

Demographic evolution

References

Cities and towns in Friuli-Venezia Giulia